Zdzisław Spieralski (9 May 1927 – 26 February 1983) was a Polish historian and journalist.

He was studying history at the University of Łódź. In 1963 he gained a Ph.D. from the University of Warsaw. Spieralski had been working as a journalist since 1949. He had been working at the Instytut Historii PAN since 1972. He was specialist at the Polish military history from 15th to 17th century.

Books 
W walce z najazdem szwedzkim, MON 1956 (with Zbigniew Kuchowicz)
Bitwa pod Koronowem 10 X 1410, Bydgoszcz 1961
Awantury mołdawskie, Wiedza Powszechna 1967
Stefan Czarniecki, 1604-1665, Wydawnictwa MON, Warszawa 1974
Jan Tarnowski 1488-1561, MON Warszawa 1977
 500 zagadek o dawnym wojsku polskim, Wiedza Powszechna, 1977
Jan Zamoyski, Wiedza Powszechna 1989

References 
Marek Barański, Spieralski Zdzisław, In: Słownik historyków polskich, ed. Maria Prosińska-Jackl, Warszawa 1994, p. 489.

20th-century Polish historians
Polish male non-fiction writers
1927 births
1983 deaths
University of Łódź alumni
University of Warsaw alumni